136th Brigade may refer to:

 136th Guards Motor Rifle Brigade, Russia
 136th Mixed Brigade, Spain
 136th (2/1st Devon and Cornwall) Brigade, United Kingdom